Walter Thurnherr (born 11 July 1963) is a Swiss government official who has served as Chancellor of Switzerland since 2016. Although he holds a traditionally nonpartisan office, he was elected as a member of the Christian Democratic People's Party (CVP/PDC). When it merged with the Conservative Democratic Party (BDP/PBD) to form The Centre (DM/LC) in 2021, Thurnherr joined the new party.

Biography

Early life
Born in Muri, Aargau, Thurnherr graduated as a physicist at the ETH Zurich in 1987, before studying mathematics at the University of Bern. In 1989, he joined the ranks of Switzerland's diplomatic corps. In 2002, he was appointed chief of staff of the Federal Department of Foreign Affairs under Federal Councillor Joseph Deiss. The following year, he was named chief of staff of the Federal Department of Economic Affairs, first under Pascal Couchepin, then Deiss and finally Doris Leuthard. He followed Leuthard when she took over the Federal Department of Environment, Transport, Energy and Communications in 2011 as her chief of staff.

Federal Chancellor 
He stood for election to succeed Corina Casanova as Chancellor of Switzerland on 9 December 2015, as the first unopposed candidate in 90 years. He was elected by the Swiss Federal Assembly with 230 votes out of 234. He assumed office on 1 January 2016. He was reelected on 11 December 2019 with 219 votes out of 224.

Personal life 
Thurnherr is active on Twitter as of 2023, where he often shares his passion for physics and mathematics. He speaks English, German, French, and learned Russian as a diplomat working in Moscow. He married with two children. In his free time he enjoys hiking and reading.

References

External links

Official biography

1963 births
21st-century Swiss politicians
Christian Democratic People's Party of Switzerland politicians
Federal Chancellors of Switzerland
Living people
ETH Zurich alumni
University of Bern alumni